Knox County is a county in the U.S. state of Nebraska. As of the 2020 United States Census, the population was 8,391. Its county seat is Center. Knox County was named for Continental and U.S. Army Major General Henry Knox.

In the Nebraska license plate system, Knox County is represented by the prefix 12 (it had the 12th-largest number of vehicles registered in the county when the license plate system was established in 1922).

History
Knox County was organized by the Territorial Legislature in 1857, and named L'Eau Qui Court, that being the French name for the river named by the Ponca Niobrara—both names meaning, in English, Running Water. The name was changed to Knox by a statute passed February 21, 1873, which took effect April 1, 1873.

Geography

Knox County lies along the north line of Nebraska. Its north boundary line abuts the south boundary line of the state of South Dakota. The terrain of the county consists of low rolling hills sloped to the northeast; most of the flat terrain is used for agriculture. The Missouri River flows eastward along the county's north boundary line. The Niobrara River enters the county's west boundary, flowing eastward then northward to drain into the Missouri River near the village of Niobrara. A smaller drainage, Verdigre Creek, flows northward into the county through the western central part of the county, draining into the Niobrara River shortly upstream of that river's mouth.

Major highways

  Nebraska Highway 12
  Nebraska Highway 13
  Nebraska Highway 14
  Nebraska Highway 59
  Nebraska Highway 84
  Nebraska Highway 121

Adjacent counties

 Bon Homme County, South Dakota - north
 Yankton County, South Dakota - northeast
 Cedar County - east
 Pierce County - southeast
 Antelope County - south
 Holt County - west
 Boyd County - northwest
 Charles Mix County, South Dakota - northwest

Protected areas

 Bazile Creek State Wildlife Management Area
 Bloomfield Recreation Area
 Deep Water Recreation Area
 Lewis and Clark Lake (part)
 Lewis and Clark State Recreation Area
 Miller Creek Recreation Area
 Missouri National Recreational River (part)
 Niobrara State Park
 South Shore Recreation Area

Demographics

As of the 2010 United States Census, there were 8,701 people, 3,647 households, and 2,368 families in the county. The population density was 7.9 people per square mile (2.95/km2). The racial makeup of the county was 87.2% White, 0.4% Black or African American, 10% Native American, 0.2% Asian, 0.0% Pacific Islander, and 1.8% from Two or More Races. 2.5% of the population were Hispanic or Latino of any race.

As of the 2000 United States Census, there were 9,374 people, 3,811 households, and 2,595 families in the county. The population density was 8 people per square mile (3/km2). There were 4,773 housing units at an average density of 4 per square mile (2/km2). The racial makeup of the county was 91.63% White, 0.09% Black or African American, 7.12% Native American, 0.16% Asian, 0.04% Pacific Islander, 0.34% from other races, and 0.63% from two or more races. 0.91% of the population were Hispanic or Latino of any race.

There were 3,811 households, out of which 29.30% had children under the age of 18 living with them, 59.00% were married couples living together, 6.00% had a female householder with no husband present, and 31.90% were non-families. 29.90% of all households were made up of individuals, and 17.40% had someone living alone who was 65 years of age or older. The average household size was 2.40 and the average family size was 2.98.

The county population contained 25.50% under the age of 18, 5.50% from 18 to 24, 21.90% from 25 to 44, 23.90% from 45 to 64, and 23.10% who were 65 years of age or older. The median age was 43 years. For every 100 females there were 96.70 males. For every 100 females age 18 and over, there were 95.20 males.

The median income for a household in the county was $27,564, and the median income for a family was $34,073. Males had a median income of $23,373 versus $18,319 for females. The per capita income for the county was $13,971.  About 12.50% of families and 15.60% of the population were below the poverty line, including 20.40% of those under age 18 and 13.50% of those age 65 or over.

Communities

Cities
 Bloomfield
 Creighton
 Crofton

Villages

 Bazile Mills
 Center (county seat)
 Niobrara
 Santee
 Verdel
 Verdigre
 Wausa
 Winnetoon

Census-designated place
 Lindy

Unincorporated communities

 Dukeville
 Jelen
 Knoxville
 Mars
 Pishelville
 Sparta
 Venus
 Walnut

Townships

 Addison
 Bohemia
 Central
 Cleveland
 Columbia
 Creighton
 Dolphin
 Dowling
 Eastern
 Frankfort
 Harrison
 Herrick
 Hill
 Jefferson
 Lincoln
 Logan
 Miller
 Morton
 Niobrara
 North Frankfort
 Peoria
 Raymond
 Spade
 Sparta
 Union
 Valley
 Verdigre
 Walnut Grove
 Washington
 Western

Politics
Knox County voters are strongly Republican. In no national election since 1936 has the county selected the Democratic Party candidate.

See also
 National Register of Historic Places listings in Knox County, Nebraska

References

External links
 Knox County website

 
Nebraska counties on the Missouri River
1857 establishments in Nebraska Territory
Populated places established in 1857